Mohamed Al Hassan (aka Mohamed Elhasan Mohamed) (born 1961) is a Sudanese American entrepreneur. He has also twice campaigned to become the President of Sudan (in 2010 and 2015).

Background
He earned a degree in philosophy from Cairo University in Khartoum before moving from Sudan to the United States in the 1980s.  In the states, he sold newspapers, candy and hot dogs on a corner in Manhattan, New York City. Wishing to expand on his ambitions, he then moved to Dallas, Texas and delivered pizzas before driving taxi cabs, eventually founding a company called Jet Taxi, which he later sold to Yellow Cab.  He also expanded his education at Spring Creek Community College in Plano. In addition to Jet Taxi, Mohamed created other companies, 'Paradise Prime Investment' in America, and the solar energy development company 'AlSufi International' in Sudan.  He currently serves as the president of the Al Sufi Center in Irving, Texas, and as vice president of the Sudan National Reform Party.

Though his name did not appear the ballots, he ran against Omar al-Bashir for the office of Sudan President in both 2010 and 2015.  An April 2015 Bloomberg Business report stated that of President Omar al-Bashir's competitors, Mohamed Elhassan Mohamed "had the most ambitious agenda".

He is a Sufi Muslim who directs the Islamic Sufi Center in Texas, established in the early 1990s.  He also leads a Sufi house of worship in Irving.  In this capacity he defended the Quran in a mock jury trial against Christian fundamentalist Rev. Terry Jones, but was greatly surprised and saddened by Jones choosing to burn the Quran as part of his exhibition, and the three days of violent response which resulted in Afghanistan.

In late 2013 a furor arose out of an Arabic-language email circulating that promised to assist parties in acquiring land in and traveling to Sudan, and resulted from the larger-than-expected turn-out of those interested in taking part.

He is married to Muna Ahmed Ibraham, and is the father of Ahmed Mohamed, who was arrested and suspended from attending his high school after bringing in to school a digital clock he had assembled that a teacher believed looked like a hoax bomb, which sparked a controversy over Islamophobia, childhood experimentation and zero-tolerance policies. Mohamed holds dual citizenship in both Sudan and the United States.

References

Living people
American Muslims
2015 in Texas
People from Irving, Texas
American people of Sudanese descent
1961 births